Hasanabad (also Romanized as Ḩasanābād) is a village in Soghan Rural District, Soghan District, Arzuiyeh County, Kerman Province, Iran. At the 2006 census, its population was 244, in 44 families.

References 

Populated places in Arzuiyeh County